NEXI or Nexi may refer to:
 Nexi, an Italian bank
Nippon Export and Investment Insurance, an incorporated administrative agency of the Japanese government that provides trade and investment insurance services
Nexi (robot), a mobile humanoid robot created by the Massachusetts Institute of Technology